Jesse Holdom (1851–1930) was a prominent Chicago lawyer and judge.

Biography

Jesse Holdom was born in London on August 23, 1851, the son of William and Eliza (Merritt) Holdom.  His Holdom ancestors had lived in the Spitalfields neighbourhood of London for nearly three hundred years, after fleeing France during the St. Bartholomew's Day massacre.  Holdom immigrated to the United States at the age of seventeen, settling in Chicago in July 1868.  Beginning in 1870, he read law with lawyer Joshua C. Knickerbocker.  He was admitted to the bar of Illinois on September 13, 1873.

Holdom practiced law with Knickerbocker.  In 1878, Knickerbocker invited Holdom to become a partner of his firm, which was then known as Knickerbocker & Holdom.  Knickerbocker retired in 1889, and Holdom continued as a solo practitioner.  He was a successful lawyer, particularly in cases involving wills and title to real estate.  Governor of Illinois Joseph W. Fifer appointed Holdom as Public Guardian.

In November 1898, Holdom was elected as a judge of the Superior Court of Cook County.

Holdom was active in the Chicago Bar Association and the Illinois State Bar Association, serving as ISBA president 1900-1901.  He was also involved in Trinity Episcopal Church, the Republican Party, and the Union League Club of Chicago.

Holdom married Edith I. Foster in 1877.  His first wife died in 1891.  Holdom remarried in 1893, to Mabel Brady.  Holdom had four children: Edith, Jessie, Martha, and Courtland.

Holdom died in Chicago on July 14, 1930.

References

Josiah Seymour Currey, Chicago: Its History and Its Builders, A Century of Marvelous Growth, Volume 5 (S. J. Clarke, 1912) pp. 314-315
The National Cyclopaedia of American Biography, Volume 11 (J. T. White Co., 1901), p. 558
A.N. Waterman, Historical review of Chicago and Cook county and selected biography (Lewis Publishing Co., 1908), pp. 581-583

External links
 

1851 births
1930 deaths
Illinois lawyers
English emigrants to the United States
Illinois Republicans
American lawyers admitted to the practice of law by reading law
Judges of the Superior Court of Cook County